The Tokyo–Montana Express is a collection by Richard Brautigan.  It contains 131 chapters which are short stories written by Brautigan from 1976 to 1978, during a period when he was dividing his time between Japan and his ranch house in Montana.  A note at the beginning of the book explains that the chapters are "stations" along the tracks of the Tokyo-Montana Express and the "I" is the voice of each of those stations.

A signed edition (limited to 350 copies) was published by Targ Editions in 1979 prior to the first trade edition published in 1980.

External links
Entry on brautigan.net

References

1980 short story collections
American short story collections
Works by Richard Brautigan